Kernowite is a mineral which was first described in 2020. It is named for Cornwall, which in the Cornish language is Kernow.

Description
Kernowite is a complex arsenate mineral with the composition . It was first described in 2020, and is closely related to liroconite, containing iron in the place of aluminium, making it green rather than blue. Its name is derived from Kernow, the name of Cornwall in the Cornish language, after being discovered in a rock mined .1800 in the Wheal Gorland mine, St Day, Cornwall.

See also

Cornwallite – a mineral also named after Cornwall

References

Further reading
 

Copper(II) minerals
Iron minerals
Arsenate minerals
Geology of Cornwall
Minerals described in 2020
2020 in England
Monoclinic minerals